Olga Eduardovna Frolkina (born 28 July 1997) is a Russian basketball player for  Dynamo Kursk and the Russian national team. Her twin sister Evgeniia is also a professional basketball player.

She participated at the 2017 FIBA U20 European Championship, and the 2020–21 EuroLeague Women with Dynamo Kursk. She was named MVP for Dynamo Kursk in the 2020–21 season.

She qualified for the 2020 Summer Olympics, playing in a team with Mariia Cherepanova, Yulia Kozik and Anastasia Logunova in the 3×3 tournament.

References 

1997 births
Living people
3x3 basketball players at the 2020 Summer Olympics
Medalists at the 2020 Summer Olympics
Olympic medalists in 3x3 basketball
Olympic 3x3 basketball players of Russia
Russian women's 3x3 basketball players
Russian women's basketball players
Small forwards
Sportspeople from Penza
Russian twins
Twin sportspeople
Olympic silver medalists for the Russian Olympic Committee athletes